Rex Kieffer (May 8, 1929 – October 26, 2001) was a member of the Ohio House of Representatives.

References

Members of the Ohio House of Representatives
1929 births
2001 deaths
20th-century American politicians